A balaclava, also known as a balaclava helmet, ski mask, or shiesty, is a form of cloth headgear designed to expose only part of the face, usually the eyes and mouth. Depending on style and how it is worn, only the eyes, mouth and nose, or just the front of the face are unprotected. Versions with enough of a full face opening may be rolled into a hat to cover the crown of the head or folded down as a collar around the neck.

History
Similar styles of headgear were known in the 19th century as the Uhlan cap worn by Polish and Prussian soldiers, and the Templar cap worn by outdoor sports enthusiasts.

The name comes from their use at the Battle of Balaclava during the Crimean War of 1854, referring to the town near Sevastopol in the Crimea, where British troops there wore knitted headgear to keep warm. Handmade balaclavas were sent over to the British troops to help protect them from the bitter cold weather. British troops required this aid, as their own supplies (warm clothing, weatherproof quarters, and food) never arrived in time. According to Richard Rutt in his History of Handknitting, the name "balaclava helmet" was not used during the war but appears much later, in 1881.

Uses

Warmth
Thin Balaclavas can be used under motorcycle or snowmobile helmets for warmth in cool or winter conditions.

Sports

Many skiers, snowboarders, cyclists, and runners wear balaclavas in cold weather for warmth. They protect the head, face, and neck from wind and low temperatures and can fit easily under helmets. These sports balaclavas can be full balaclavas, which cover the entire head leaving only the eyes uncovered, or half-balaclavas, which leave the forehead free, but cover most of the head. Key elements of sports balaclavas are that they are warm, windproof, and moisture-wicking.

Racing

Race drivers in Fédération Internationale de l'Automobile sanctioned events must wear balaclavas made of fire-retardant material underneath their crash helmets. In racing events, hill-climbs, special stages of rallies and selective sections of cross-country events entered on the International Sporting Calendar, all drivers and co-drivers must wear overalls as well as gloves (optional for co-drivers), long underwear, a balaclava, and shoes homologated to the FIA 8856-2000 standard.

Concealment

Balaclavas are in certain contexts associated with criminality as gang members have used them to conceal their identity. In 2004, police in Prestwich, England, began demanding that people on the street remove their balaclavas, describing the garment as "extremely threatening". In 2012, police in Kent confiscated a copy of the War on Terror board game partly because of the inclusion of a balaclava, stating "could be used to conceal someone's identity or could be used in the course of a criminal act."

Military and police

In South Asia, balaclavas are commonly referred to as monkey caps because of their typical earth tone colours, and the fact that they blot out most human facial features. Monkey caps sometimes have a small, decorative, woollen pom-pom on top. They are commonly worn by troops on Himalayan duty for protection from the cold.

The United States Marine Corps has recently begun issuing balaclavas with hinged face guards as part of the Flame Resistant Organizational Gear program.

In the Soviet Union, the balaclava became a part of standard OMON (special police task force) uniform as early as the Perestroyka years of the late 1980s. The original intent was to protect the identity of the officers to avoid intimidation from organized crime. Because of increased problems with organized crime of the 1990s, TV shots of armed men in black balaclavas became common. Armed Russian police commonly conduct raids and searches of white-collar premises (typically in Moscow) while wearing balaclavas. Such raids have therefore come to be known in Russia as "maski shows", an allusion to a popular comic TV show of the 1990s.

Balaclavas are often used by police battling drug cartels and gangs in Latin America to conceal their identity and protect their families.

Fashion 
Knitted balaclavas were featured in some collections at the 2018 New York Fashion Week.

See also

 Anti-flash gear
 Anti-mask laws
 Facekini
 Knit cap
 Mask
 Neck gaiter
 Keffiyeh
 "Ski mask" toque—Canadian English; also commonly worn when using snowmobiles; typically a three-hole balaclava with generous neck tube for maximal wind protection

References

External links
 

Cloth masks
Headgear
Hiking apparel
Military masks
Political masks
Safety clothing
Sports masks
Winter clothes